Bo-Dzhausa Mountain is a volcanic mountain in Primorsky Krai, Russia and a part of the Sikhote-Alin mountain range. The nearest inhabited place is the village Grossevichi. The mountain is accessible from the town of Dalnegorsk, as well as Sovetskaya Gavan.

The mountain is believed to be the site of a geophysical anomaly, responsible for several aviation accidents, such as Khabarovsk United Air Group Flight 3949.

References

Mountains of Primorsky Krai
Sikhote-Alin